Kelin Poldy Rivera Kroll (born 1 October 1993) is a Peruvian business manager, entrepreneur, social advocate, model, and beauty pageant titleholder who holds the international crown of World Miss University 2016 and the national crown of Miss Peru 2019. She represented Peru at the Miss Universe 2019 competition where she placed as a Top 10 finalist.

Early life and education
Rivera was born in the city of Arequipa, and was raised in the city of Oxapampa. She began modeling as a teenager and pursued a career in the country's capital, Lima. She eventually graduated with a degree in business administration from the Universidad San Ignacio de Loyola. While continuing working as a model, she went on to develop her career as a businesswoman in the area of international commerce. Since young, she has volunteered in events to help people in need and is also an advocate for violence against women in her native country. She works alongside the Programa Integral Nacional para el Bienestar Familiar (INABIF), a Peruvian government institution that fosters children and teenagers that have been abandoned by their families or have suffered from abuse. Rivera works closely with this group by tutoring them in their classes as well as offering psychological support after their traumas. As a spokeswoman for the Miss Peru Organization and the National Police of Peru, she hopes to use her platform to motivate women that have been victims of abuse and help them develop the courage to bring their assaulters to justice. Also, after winning her national title, she was named an ambassador for vicuña wool by the Peruvian government where she works with communities that sell this wool to help boost their economy and promote sustainability.

Pageantry
Having started modeling as a teenager, Rivera's first adventure in the world of pageants came at the age of 18, when she participated in the Miss Peru 2013 pageant for the first time on June 30 of 2012, as one of the youngest candidates in that year's edition and placed as the 2nd Runner-Up on the final night. Thanks to this result, it gave her the right to represent Peru at the Reina Hispanoamericana 2013 pageant in Santa Cruz, Bolivia where in her first international pageant she went unplaced but won the special award of "Miss Elegance." The following year, to gain more experience, she competed in her second international contest, at the Reinado International de la Ganaderia 2014 in Monteria, Colombia, where she placed 1st Runner-Up to Taynara Santana Gargantini of Brazil.

Having taken a break from pageants to focus on her studies, she came back in 2016 where she won the national collegiate title of World Miss University Peru 2016 in order to participate at the international level for a third time. Rivera traveled to Beijing, China to represent Peru at World Miss University 2016, where she defeated 56 other candidates from across the world to become the first Peruvian and first South American to win the title. She was crowned by the outgoing titleholder, Karina Martin from Mexico.

The following year on October 29, 2017, she returned to the country's national pageant (in order to participate in 2018 events) and for the second time finished as 2nd Runner-Up. Her placement here gave her the chance to represent Peru internationally again, at the Miss Eco International 2018 pageant in Cairo, Egypt, where she placed as the 2nd Runner-Up.

Two years later, the Miss Peru organization featured a restructure due to incidents early in the year and called for a special edition of the 2019 pageant, where it was a requirement to have previous pageantry experience at the international or national level. Only ten candidates where selected in a rigorous casting call and interviews to compete for the national crown. On the night of October 20 and cited as a favorite for the title, Rivera went on to become Miss Perú 2019 on her third attempt at the crown at age 26.

She represented Peru at the Miss Universe 2019 pageant in Atlanta, Georgia, where she was a Top 10 finalist. Rivera was the 19th Peruvian to place in Miss Universe history.

References

External links
 

People from Arequipa
Peruvian female models
Miss Universe 2019 contestants
1993 births
Living people
Peruvian people of German descent
Peruvian beauty pageant winners
Universidad San Ignacio de Loyola alumni
World Miss University